In astronomy, a RAMBO or robust association of massive baryonic objects is a dark cluster made of brown dwarfs or white dwarfs.

RAMBOs were proposed by Moore and Silk in 1995. They may have an effective radius between 1 and 15 pc, with masses in the range .

Dynamics 
The dynamics of these objects, if they do exist, must be quite different from that of standard star clusters. With a very narrow mass range (all brown dwarfs or white dwarfs), the evaporation rate of these RAMBOs should be very slow as predicted by the evolution of simulated mono-component cluster models. Theoretically, these very long-lived objects could exist in large numbers. The presence of a clustered thick disk-like component of dark matter in the Galaxy has been suggested by Sanchez-Salcedo (1997, 1999) and Kerins (1997).

See also
 Dark matter
 Brown dwarfs
 White dwarfs
 Microlensing
 Hypercompact stellar system
 Massive compact halo object (MACHOs)
 Weakly interacting massive particles (WIMPs)

References

Star clusters
Open clusters